The Perth Hebrew Congregation (often shortened as the PHC) is synagogue located in the Perth, suburb of , Western Australia. Established as an organization in 1892, it is the oldest of three shuls and one temple serving the Jewish community in Perth. The synagogue includes a child care - namely Ruth Landau Harp Early Learning offering education to children aged from 6 weeks to 5 years, educating children on the Jewish calendar of events and Jewish values, with all meals being kosher. The synagogue offers facilities for daily services, educational programmes, PHC also houses a library, a mikveh and a bookshop. In July 2004, the shul was heavily defaced with anti-Semitic vandalism.

Overview 
The first two scrolls in the possession of the Perth Hebrew Congregation were gifts from members of the Montefiore clan.

The project was to "design and erect a perimeter security fence complete with access controls around the premises of the Perth Synagogue". The rationale was for protection of the premises and population in the event of a potential attack on PHC.

History 
The first Jewish congregation in Western Australia was founded in Fremantle in 1887, when Benjamin Solomon organised the necessary fundraising and construction of the Fremantle Synagogue on the corner of South Terrace and Parry Street. The Reverend Abraham Tobias Boas came to Fremantle from Adelaide to lay the foundation stone of the new building, in 1891. It was opened in 1897, but did not last long as a place of worship because the congregation was absorbed into the Perth Hebrew Congregation in 1907.

For the more orthodox Jewish settlers, the more Anglicized services of the Perth Hebrew Congregation had no appeal. They formed the Perth Jewry Association and built a synagogue known as the Palmerston Shule. Possible conflict between the two congregations was avoided thorough the leadership of Perth Jewry's first minister, Rabbi D. I. Freedman who served in the Perth Hebrew Congregation for 42 years from 1897 up until his death in 1939.

List of rabbis
Rabbi David Isaac Freedman (1897–1939)
Rabbi Louis Rubin-Zacks (1939–1964)
Rev Emanuel Fischer (1964–1967)
Rabbi Dr Shalom Coleman (1965–1985)
Rabbi Michael Orelowitz (1985–1986)
Rabbi David Freilich (1988 - 2018)
Rabbi Daniel Lieberman (2018–present)

See also 

 Carmel School

References

Further reading

External links

Jews and Judaism in Western Australia
Synagogues in Australia
Religious buildings and structures in Perth, Western Australia
1892 establishments in Australia
Synagogues completed in 1892